The Kids from the Brady Bunch is the third studio album by American pop group the Brady Bunch. It was released on December 4, 1972, by Paramount Records. Two songs on the album, "It's a Sunshine Day" and "Keep On", were featured on season 4, episode 16 of The Brady Bunch, "Amateur Nite".

In 1996, the album was released on CD for the first time with the addition of three bonus tracks from 1973's Chris Knight & Maureen McCormick.

Critical reception

In the December 16, 1972 issue, Billboard published a review that said: "Christmas season should give added sales punch to this LP, which also has a popular television show going for it. Best cuts: "Ben" and "You Need That Rock 'n' Roll". Dealer should also place this in the children's browser box".

Commercial performance
The album and its singles failed to appear on any music charts.

Track listing

Personnel
Adapted from the album liner notes.
 Al Capps – arrangements
 Chris Knight – vocals
 Bill Levy – art direction
 Mike Lookinland – vocals
 Maureen McCormick – vocals
 Jackie Mills – producer
 Susan Olsen – vocals
 Pacific Eye & Ear – design concept
 Joe Petagno – cover illustrations
 Eve Plumb – vocals
 Lenny Roberts – engineer
 Barry Williams – vocals

References

1972 albums
The Brady Bunch albums
Paramount Records (1969) albums